The Somali bulbul (Pycnonotus somaliensis) is a member of the bulbul family of passerine birds. It is found in north-eastern Africa.

Taxonomy and systematics
Some authorities treat the Somali bulbul as a subspecies of the common bulbul and formerly it has also been considered as a subspecies of the dark-capped bulbul. The alternate name, Abyssinian bulbul, is also used as the name for Pycnonotus barbatus schoanus.

Distribution and habitat
The Somali bulbul is found in Djibouti, north-western Somalia and north-eastern Ethiopia.

References

Somali bulbul
Birds of the Horn of Africa
Somali bulbul